The Italian language surname Sarti is derived from the occupation of tailor. Notable people with the surname include:

Adolfo Sarti (1928–1992), Italian Christian Democrat politician
Alessio Sarti (born 1979), Italian football (soccer) goalkeeper
Antun Sarti, Dalmatian politician, was Mayor of Split
Benito Sarti (born 1936), retired Italian professional football player
Eleonora Sarti (born 1986), Italian female compound archer and part of the national team
Ercole Sarti (born 1593), Italian painter of the Baroque period, active in Ferrara
Giuliano Sarti (1933–2017), former Italian footballer
Giuseppe Sarti (1729–1802), Italian opera composer
Leo Sarti (born 1956), Sammarinese judoka
Lucien Sarti (c. 1931 – 1972), drug trafficker and killer-for-hire involved in the infamous French Connection heroin network
Paolo Sarti, Italian painter
Prospero Sarti (died 1904), Italian engineer, architect, engraver, and collector of antiquities, including a numismatist of ancient Roman coins
Taddeo Sarti (1540–1617), Roman Catholic prelate, Bishop of Nepi and Sutri
Vagner da Silva Sarti (born 1978), former Brazilian football player

See also
Sarti surface, surface with 600 nodes, found by Alessandra Sarti 2008
Sarati
Sart
Sati (disambiguation)

Occupational surnames
Italian-language surnames